The Rig Jenn ( ‘Dune of the Jinn’) is a vast area of sand dunes in the middle of Dasht-e Kavir, Iran's central desert in the border region of the Semnan and Isfahan provinces. It was not travelled by the old caravan travellers,  who believed it is a place where evil spirits live. Even today some in the neighbouring towns and villages believe this. Sven Hedin, the famous desert explorer avoided this area in his 1900s explorations to Iranian deserts.

The Austrian geographer Alfons Gabriel crossed the southern 'tail' of it on his way from Ashin to Arusan in the 1930s.

Dunes of Iran
Landforms of Semnan Province
Jinn-related places
Landforms of Isfahan Province
Ergs